ETEN or Eten may refer to:
ETEN operation system, a Chinese OS
European Teacher Education Network
Eten Island, an island to the south-east of Tonowas, Micronesia
E-TEN, an electronics manufacturing company based in Taiwan